We the Animals (2011) is the debut novel by the American author Justin Torres. It is a bildungsroman about three wild brothers of white and Puerto Rican parentage who live a rough and tumble childhood in rural upstate New York during the 1980s. The youngest brother, who is the protagonist, eventually breaks away from the rest of the family.

The novel is semi-autobiographical and is loosely based on Torres's own life growing up in up-state New York.

Plot
The young, unnamed narrator, a boy, grows up in a tight-knit family with two older brothers, Manny and Joel. His parents, who were teenagers when the boys were conceived and they married, have an abusive unhappy marriage but still feel love for each other.

In a series of vignettes, the narrator describes how his parents struggle to keep the family afloat and how his father, and eventually his brothers, are abusive towards his mother who is deeply unhappy and longs for a better life.

As the narrator grows up, he senses a difference between himself and his brothers, which is partially caused by his love of literature and partially caused by the fact that he is gay. After his parents discover his journal, which is filled with erotic imaginings and fantasies, the narrator lashes out, violently attacking his parents and sibling, after which he is interred at a psychiatric ward.

Reception
We the Animals received generally positive reviews, including warm notices from The New York Times and Kirkus Reviews  and praise from such novelists and writers as Michael Cunningham, Dorothy Allison and Paul Harding. It was nominated for a Publishing Triangle Award, an NAACP Image Award, and it won an Indies Choice Book Award.

Film adaptation

A film adaptation of We the Animals, directed by Jeremiah Zagar, premiered at the 2018 Sundance Film Festival.

References

2011 American novels
American bildungsromans
Hispanic and Latino American novels
American novellas
Novels set in New York (state)
Puerto Rican literature
American novels adapted into films
2011 debut novels
Houghton Mifflin books